The German Order was the highest award that the Nazi Party could bestow on an individual for his services to the "state and party". It was designed by Benno von Arent. Adolf Hitler awarded the first such order posthumously to Reichsminister Fritz Todt during Todt's funeral in February 1942. A second posthumous award of the German Order was given to SS-Obergruppenführer Reinhard Heydrich at his funeral in June that year. Cynics called the award the "dead hero order" as it was almost always awarded posthumously. The only two recipients who received the German Order and survived the war were Konstantin Hierl and Artur Axmann.

Description 
The black enamel cross in the middle section of the award resembled that of the Iron Cross and the medal also had similarities in design to the Order of the German Eagle. It measured 48.5 mm across the arms of the cross. At the centre was a medallion, which measured 20.5 mm. In between the arms of the cross were national eagles with furled wings. Each one of the four eagles with a wreath clutched in its claws. At the center of the medal is the Golden Party Badge.
The concept of the order was based of the ceremonial regalia of the Grand Master of the Teutonic Order, the Marian Cross of the Teutonic Order, the Knight's Cross of the Iron Cross and of the cross of the Knight of Justice of the Order of St. John (Bailiwick of Brandenburg).
The German Order was originally to be awarded in three grades, but only the neck order (the highest grade) was ever awarded. This award is considered the second rarest award of Nazi Germany after the National Prize for Art and Science. The holders of this award were supposed to form a confraternity.

Adolf Hitler regarded this award as his personal decoration to be bestowed only upon those whose services to the state, party, and the people, he deemed worthy. For this reason, plus the fact that the reverse of the medal bears a facsimile of his signature, it was also informally known as the 'Hitler Order'. There were eleven confirmed recipients of this award between 1942 and 1945:

 Fritz Todt, 11 February 1942 (posthumous)
 Reinhard Heydrich, 9 June 1942 (posthumous)
 Adolf Hühnlein, 22 June 1942 (posthumous)
 Viktor Lutze, 7 May 1943 (posthumous)
 Adolf Wagner, 17 April 1944 (posthumous)
 Josef Bürckel, 3 October 1944 (posthumous)
 Rudolf Schmundt, 7 October 1944 (posthumous)
 Konstantin Hierl, 24 February 1945
 Karl Hanke, 12 April 1945 (killed during a POW escape attempt at a transport on 8 June 1945)
 Karl Holz, 19 April 1945 (killed in action on 20 April 1945)
 Artur Axmann, 28 April 1945

Notes

References 

Orders, decorations, and medals of Nazi Germany